Zona de Promesas: mixes 1984-1993 (Spanish for Zone of Promises) is an album recorded by Argentine rock band Soda Stereo. Their tenth album was released by Sony Music Entertainment in 1993. The album is composed of a series of remixes recorded by Soda Stereo that range between 1984 and 1993 and Zona de promesas, a track left in the cutting room of the band's previous album, Dynamo. This was the last album released through the Sony label.

Track listing
 "Zona de Promesas" (Cerati)  (Zone of Promises) 
 "Primavera 0 [Bonzo Mix]"
 "En la Ciudad de la Furia [Dance Mix]"
 "Nada Personal [Rémix]"
 "Luna Roja [Soul Mix]"
 "Cuando Pase el Temblor [Oíd Mortales Mix]"
 "Mundo de Quimeras"
 "No Necesito Verte (Para Saberlo) [Krupa Mix]"
 "Sobredosis de TV [Rémix]"
 "Lo Que Sangra (La Cúpula) [Versión Rémix]"

Personnel
Soda Stereo
 Gustavo Cerati: vocals, guitar and programming
 Zeta Bosio: bass and backing vocals
 Charly Alberti: drums and percussion

Soda Stereo remix albums
1993 remix albums
Sony Music remix albums
Spanish-language remix albums